The 1907 Lehigh Brown and White football team was an American football team that represented Lehigh University as an independent during the 1907 college football season. In its second season under head coach Byron W. Dickson, the team compiled a 7–2–1 record and outscored opponents by a total of 198 to 45. The team played its home games at Lehigh Field in Bethlehem, Pennsylvania.

Schedule

References

Lehigh
Lehigh Mountain Hawks football seasons
Lehigh football